The 1999 Nürburgring Superbike World Championship round was the 6th round of the 1999 Superbike World Championship season. It took place on the weekend of 11–13 June 1999 at the Nürburgring. It was strongly criticised by the riders after track officials failed to show race flags. Carl Fogarty and Troy Corser won Race 1 and Race 2 respectively.

Controversy 
During Race 1, Igor Jerman's Kawasaki dumped oil at the Castrol Curve, causing multiple other riders to crash, including Noriyuki Haga, Akira Yanagawa, Pierfrancesco Chili and Colin Edwards, due to marshals failing to show Oil Flags. The marshals also failed to show Blue Flags and as a result Fogarty collided with back-marker Lothar Kraus, knocking Kraus off his bike and out of the race. Kraus blamed the flag marshals for the incident, as could be seen from his gestures immediately after the crash.

When Edwards went down, he was livid and showed his anger by throwing gravel on the track and showing his middle finger multiple times. After the race Edwards stated "I'm not coming back to this f***ing country ever again", that he didn't care about the second race and that he wanted to go home and play some golf.

Superbike race 1 classification

Superbike race 2 classification

Supersport race classification

References

Nurburgring Superbike World Championship round, 1999
Nurburgring Superbike World Championship round
Sport in Rhineland-Palatinate